Victoria Hollins is a British journalist, who works for BBC London News as a reporter and newsreader, mostly working the early morning bulletins on BBC Breakfast.

Early life
Hollins studied at the British School in the Netherlands and the British School of Brussels, before studying at the University of Birmingham from 1995. She then did a post graduate diploma in Journalism at Cardiff University.

Journalism career
Hollins joined the BBC in 1999 on their journalistic training scheme, working on local BBC radio stations, then as a news presenter on BBC Radio Five Live. She spent five years at BBC London 94.9, before joining the BBC London News on TV. In 2014 Hollins ate a pair of brown shoes for charity as part of Children in Need.

Other activities
In 2011, Hollins appeared as a television presenter in the BBC sitcom Life's Too Short.

References

External links
BBC London News - Presenter profiles BBC One

Year of birth missing (living people)
Living people
Alumni of the University of Birmingham
Alumni of Cardiff University
BBC newsreaders and journalists